Brian Mills (born 26 December 1971) is an English former footballer. A forward who scored four goals in 23 games for Port Vale in the Football League, his brief professional career was ended by illness in 1993.

Career
Mills joined Port Vale's junior squad at the age of 14 after being spotted while playing for Stafford & District schools and Staffordshire county schools. After foru years of coaching from Mike Pejic, he went on to sign professional forms under manager John Rudge in April 1990. He scored twice on his full debut on 11 May 1991, in a 3–1 win over Swindon Town at Vale Park. This was the last game of the 1990–91 season. He was selected for the England squad at the 1991 FIFA World Youth Championship in Portugal, and started in the game against Uruguay before he was taken off for Premier League star Andrew Cole. He scored three goals in 27 league and cup games in 1991–92, as the "Valiants" suffered relegation out of the Second Division. He scored in a 2–1 home win over Notts County on 24 September 1991, in the first leg of the First Round of the League Cup. He also scored in a 1–1 home draw with Charlton Athletic on 21 April 1992, and also found the net in a 4–2 defeat to Cambridge United at the Abbey Stadium four days later.

Mills was hospitalized in March 1992 with a rare virus and was released from his contract in September 1993; still not fit to play full-time. Still only 21 and with a mere 23 league appearances and four goals to his name, he never played professional football again due to the damage to his spinal cord caused by the virus.

Post-retirement
After leaving the professional game, he graduated from Loughborough University with a degree in Physics and Sports Science and became a schoolteacher. He also became a keen powerlifter, winning West Midlands bench press titles in the 69 kg class and becoming the British Masters 1 unequipped bench press champion.

Career statistics
Source:

References

1971 births
Living people
People from Stone, Staffordshire
People from Barton-under-Needwood
English footballers
England youth international footballers
Association football forwards
Port Vale F.C. players
English Football League players
Alumni of Loughborough University
Schoolteachers from Staffordshire
British powerlifters